1964 Soviet Class B was a Soviet football competition at the Soviet third tier.

Russian Federation

Semifinal Group 1
 [Grozny]

Semifinal Group 2
 [Orjonikidze]

Final Group
 [Nov 9-17, Orjonikidze]

Additional final
 RostSelMash Rostov-na-Donu  2-0  Terek Grozny

Ukraine

This season to the Ukrainian zone were added four teams from Belarus and three teams from Moldova. SKA Odessa did not participate as it gained its promotion last season. Two other newcomers were added: FC Chayka Balaklava and FC Dunayets Izmail.

This season play-off featured a mini League format. The two successive ranking teams from one group were put together in group with the other two teams from other two groups of equal rank. For example, the first two placed teams of each group played off between themselves for the final ranking. Teams from Belarus and Moldova did not participate at this stage.

Second stage for places 1-6

Second stage for places 7-12

Union republics
 [Oct 18-28, Klaipeda]

Additional final
 [Nov 1, Kaliningrad]
 Granitas Klaipeda  2-0 Vostok Ust-Kamenogorsk

References
 All-Soviet Archive Site
 Results. RSSSF
 wildstat.com

Soviet Second League seasons
3
Soviet
Soviet